Scoda Aeronáutica is a Brazilian aircraft manufacturer founded in 1997 and based at Ipeúna, São Paulo.

Aircraft

References

External links
 Scoda Aeronáutica website

Aircraft manufacturers of Brazil
Companies based in São Paulo (state)
Brazilian brands